Kesiapalli is a small census village in Nayagarh district of Indian state, Odisha. It is administered under Kulasara Grampanchayat and comes under the Ranapur tehsil. The small village had a population of 269 in 2011. It has a total area of 46 hectares out of which 1.01 hectares are irrigated land, 40.65 hectares are unirrigated land and 4.74 hectares are non-agricultural land.

References 

Villages in Nayagarh district